Paulo Luiz Beraldo Santos (born 14 June 1988), commonly known as Paulinho, is a Brazilian footballer who plays for Anápolis. Mainly a forward, he can also appear as a winger or an attacking midfielder.

Club career

Early career

Born in Guarulhos, São Paulo, Paulinho joined hometown club Flamengo's youth setup in 2006, after starting it out at amateurs Vasco da Gama de Vila Galvão. In 2008, after impressing with the first team, he was linked to a move to São Paulo, but it did not materialize.

In 2009, after failed trials at Corinthians, Paulinho moved to XV de Piracicaba. With the club he experienced two promotions, and was also the top scorer of 2011 Copa Paulista.

On 13 July 2012, Paulinho was loaned to PFC Ludogorets Razgrad for six months. Four days later, however, he left the club after alleging 'personal reasons'.

Flamengo
On 7 May 2013, after impressing in the year's Campeonato Paulista, Paulinho signed for Série A side Flamengo along with XV teammate Diego Silva. He made his Série A debut on 26 May, coming on as a late substitute for Gabriel in a 0–0 away draw against Santos.

Paulinho scored his first top flight goal on 14 July 2013, netting the game's only in an away success at fierce rivals Vasco da Gama. He finished the season with 33 appearances and four goals, overtaking Marcelo Moreno as a first-choice along with Hernane.

On 7 April 2014, Paulinho signed a new four-year deal with Fla, who paid R$1 million fee for 60% of his federative rights. He continued to appear regularly until September, when he suffered a knee injury which took him out of action for six months.

On 13 September 2015, during his 100th match for Flamengo, Paulinho scored the first goal through a spectacular volley in a 3–1 away success over Chapecoense.

Santos (loan)
On 4 January 2016 Paulinho moved to Santos, in a one-year loan deal. He made his debut for the club late in the month, starting in a 1–1 home draw against São Bernardo.

Paulinho scored his first goals for Peixe on 31 March 2016, netting a brace in a 4–1 home routing of Ferroviária. However, after the arrivals of Jean Mota, Jonathan Copete and Emiliano Vecchio, he fell through the pecking order and only appeared rarely.

Vitória (loan)
On 18 January 2017 Paulinho signed on loan with Vitória until the end of the season, but was released in July, after appearing rarely.

Guarani (loan)
On 16 August 2017 Paulinho signed on loan with Guarani until the end of the season.

Career statistics

Honours

Club
Flamengo-SP
Campeonato Paulista Série A3: 2008

Flamengo
Copa do Brasil: 2013
Campeonato Carioca: 2014

Santos
Campeonato Paulista: 2016

Vitória
 Campeonato Baiano: 2017

Individual
Copa Paulista Top Scorer: 2011

References

External links
Flamengo official profile 

1988 births
Living people
People from Guarulhos
Brazilian footballers
Brazilian expatriate footballers
Association football wingers
Association football forwards
Campeonato Brasileiro Série A players
Campeonato Brasileiro Série B players
Campeonato Brasileiro Série C players
K League 1 players
Associação Atlética Flamengo players
Esporte Clube XV de Novembro (Piracicaba) players
CR Flamengo footballers
Santos FC players
Esporte Clube Vitória players
Guarani FC players
PFC Ludogorets Razgrad players
Gyeongnam FC players
Clube Náutico Capibaribe players
Anápolis Futebol Clube players
Brazilian expatriate sportspeople in Bulgaria
Brazilian expatriate sportspeople in South Korea
Expatriate footballers in Bulgaria
Expatriate footballers in South Korea
Footballers from São Paulo (state)